The Doris Day Show was an American old-time radio musical program . It was broadcast on CBS from March 28, 1952, to May 26, 1953.

Format
Star Doris Day's singing highlighted the show, and each episode usually featured a guest star.

The program was sponsored initially by and later the Rexall drug company as a summer replacement for Amos 'n' Andy. It was later sponsored by CBS-Columbia, Incorporated, the manufacturing subsidiary of CBS.

"It's Magic" was the theme.

Personnel
As the show's title implies, Doris Day was the star. Les Brown and his orchestra provided instrumental music. The announcers were Don Wilson, Johnny Jacobs and Roy Rowan. Sam Pierce was the producer and director.

References

External links

Streaming
Episodes of The Doris Day Show from Old Time Radio Researchers Group Library

1952 radio programme debuts
1953 radio programme endings
1950s American radio programs
CBS Radio programs
American music radio programs
Doris Day